On January 15, 2010, the U.S. Department of Defense published a list of Detainees held in the Bagram Theater Internment Facility that included the name Maulawi Qabil.

According to historian Andy Worthington, author of The Guantanamo Files and the Afghanistan Times he was captured on June 13, 2009, Konar Province.

No further information is known about this individual.

References

Bagram Theater Internment Facility detainees
Living people
Year of birth missing (living people)